Valence Romans Drôme Rugby (formerly L’Union sportive romanaise and péageoise) is a French rugby union club based in Romans-sur-Isère (Drôme).  For the 2021–22 season they will be playing in Nationale having been relegated from Rugby Pro D2.

History
L’US romanaise and péageoise was founded in 1908 as the sport association of two town on both side of the Isère, Romans-sur-Isère and Bourg-de-Péage. Le club was the formed by a lot of worker of Shoes's factory.  After the Second World War, the club was promoted in Top 16 and reach two times the semifinals (1954 and 1955), and in 1969 reach again the quarter of finals. This defined US Romans as one of the strongest French club in the 70's.  In 1976, the "Damiers" (nickname of the players) lost the quarter of final against the future champion, Agen, and 1977 lost the semifinals against Perpignan (6-9).  For eight consecutive years, Romans will pass the first round of the Championship.  A first relegation in "Groupe B" in 1988, was followed by a return in "Group A". in 1990.  In 1992, the club was again relegated. In 1995 Romans lost the "Groupe B1" final against FC Lourdes (a stunning match closed 37–36).  A lot of famous French player have played at USRP in the past: like Arnaldo Gruarin, Robert Soro and Philippe Saint-André.

Now the club play in Fédérale 1, the third level of French rugby union system, after some year in the lower Fédérale 2.  In 2018-19 they were promoted from Fédérale 1 into Rugby Pro D2. They now are called Valence Romans Drôme Rugby.

Current standings

Palmares
 Championnat of France Première Division
 Semifinalist : 1954, 1955, 1977
 Quart of Final : 1976
 Eights of Finalist : 1978, 1981,
 16th of Final : 1975, 1979, 1980, 1982, 1986
Championnat of France Première Division Groupe B1
 Finalist : 1995
Championnat of France 2nd division série
Finalist: 1959
Championnat of France Reichel
 Winner : 1983
Championnat of France Crabos
 Winner : 1974
Championnat of France Cadet
 Finalist: 1998
 Winner : 1989
 Finalist : 1979
Championnat of France Minimes
 Finalist : 1998
Championnat of France Nationale B
 Finalist 2009
 Semifinalist 2010
 Semifinalist 2011
Challenge Gaudermen (Cadets)
 Winner : 1989
 Semifinalist : 1979

Other competitions 
 Winner of Challenge of l'Espérance (1) : 1956
 Finalist du Challenge of l'Espérance (1) : 1992

Famous players

External links
Official Site
Actualité sportive of la Drôme

French rugby union clubs
Romans
1908 establishments in France